The 2017 Danish Handball Cup, known as Santander Cup 2017 for sponsorship reasons, is the 54th edition of the national women's handball cup tournament. Randers HK are the defending champions.

Format
The initial 6 rounds are managed by the regional federations with the DHF taking over the tournament at the round of 16. It ultimately results in a final four event between Christmas and New Year. The winner of the tournament qualify for the Super Cup where they meet the season's league winner. If the same team wins both the league and the cup, the losing cup finalist will be participating in the Super Cup.

Round of 16
The round of 16 ties were scheduled for 23–30 August 2017.

|-
!colspan="3" style="background:#ccccff;"| 23 August

|-
!colspan="3" style="background:#ccccff;"| 24 August

|-
!colspan="3" style="background:#ccccff;"| 25 August

|-
!colspan="3" style="background:#ccccff;"| 26 August

|-
!colspan="3" style="background:#ccccff;"| 27 August

|-
!colspan="3" style="background:#ccccff;"| 30 August

|}

Quarter-finals
The quarter-final ties are scheduled for 24–25 October 2017.

|-
!colspan="3" style="background:#ccccff;"| 24 October

|-
!colspan="3" style="background:#ccccff;"| 25 October

|}

Final4
The final four event is scheduled for 29-30 December 2017 in Jysk Arena, Silkeborg.

Semi-finals

Bronze medal match

Final

Final ranking and statistics

Top goalscorers
.

Most valuable player
MVP was announced after the final on 30 December 2017.

References

External links 
 The Danish Handball Federation 

Handball competitions in Denmark